As the Sea Rages (German: Raubfischer in Hellas) is a 1959 drama film directed by Horst Hächler and starring Maria Schell, Cliff Robertson and Cameron Mitchell.  It is based on Werner Helwig's novel Raubfischer in Hellas. It was shot on location on the Dalmatian Coast. The film's sets were designed by the art directors Hertha Hareiter and Otto Pischinger

Cast
Maria Schell as Mana
Cliff Robertson as Clements
Cameron Mitchell as Psarathanas
Peter Carsten as Panagos
Fritz Tillmann as Captain Stassi
Ivan Kostic as Samsarello
Nikola Popovic	as Barbanji
 as Pope

Reception
Leonard Maltin awarded the film two stars.

References

External links
 

1950s English-language films
English-language German films
English-language Yugoslav films
1950s German-language films
1959 films
Columbia Pictures films
West German films
American drama films
German drama films
Yugoslav drama films
Films based on German novels
Seafaring films
Films about fishing
Films set in Greece
Films set in the Mediterranean Sea
Films directed by Horst Hächler
1950s multilingual films
American multilingual films
German multilingual films
Yugoslav multilingual films
1950s American films
1950s German films